Nordi Mukiele Mulere (born 1 November 1997) is a French professional footballer who plays as a defender for Ligue 1 club Paris Saint-Germain and the France national team. Mainly a right-back, he can also play as a centre-back.

Early life
Mukiele was born in Montreuil, France to parents of DR Congolese descent.

Club career

Laval 
Mukiele began his professional career in Laval, where he broke into the first team age 17. He made his debut on 28 November 2014 in a 1–1 Ligue 2 draw against Auxerre. Mukiele gained attention while playing for Laval and eventually transferred to Montpellier for a fee of €1.35 million.

Montpellier 
Mukiele transferred to Montpellier in January 2017. He made his debut for the club on 21 January 2017 in a 2–0 Ligue 1 loss against Metz.

RB Leipzig 

In 2018, Mukiele signed for Bundesliga club RB Leipzig on a five-year contract. The transfer fee paid to Montpellier was of €16 million. He made his debut for the club on 26 July 2018, in a UEFA Europa League qualifier against Häcken that ended as 4–0 win. Mukiele's first league appearance came in a 1–1 draw with Fortuna Düsseldorf on 2 September 2018. On 18 May 2019, he scored his first goal for RB Leipzig in a 2–1 league defeat away to Werder Bremen.

On 2 December 2020, Mukiele scored his first UEFA Champions League goal in a 4–3 away win over İstanbul Başakşehir. During the 2021–22 season with RB Leipzig, he participated in his team's DFB-Pokal Final victory over SC Freiburg, the first trophy of his career.

Paris Saint-Germain 
On 26 July 2022, Mukiele signed for Ligue 1 club Paris Saint-Germain (PSG) on a five-year contract until 30 June 2027. The transfer fee paid to RB Leipzig was reported to be €10 million, with a potential €6 million in bonuses. On 31 July, he made his debut for PSG in a 4–0 win over Nantes in the Trophée des Champions.

International career
Mukiele received his first call up to the senior France squad for FIFA World Cup qualification in September 2021. He made his debut on 7 September 2021 in a match against Finland, a 2–0 home victory. He substituted Léo Dubois in the 67th minute.

Career statistics

Club

International

Honours
RB Leipzig
DFB-Pokal: 2021–22; runner-up: 2020–21
Paris Saint-Germain

 Trophée des Champions: 2022

References

External links

 
 
 
 

1997 births
Living people
Sportspeople from Montreuil, Seine-Saint-Denis
French footballers
France youth international footballers
France under-21 international footballers
France international footballers
Association football defenders
Paris FC players
Stade Lavallois players
Montpellier HSC players
RB Leipzig players
Paris Saint-Germain F.C. players
Ligue 2 players
Ligue 1 players
Bundesliga players
French expatriate footballers
Expatriate footballers in Germany
French expatriate sportspeople in Germany
French sportspeople of Democratic Republic of the Congo descent
Footballers from Seine-Saint-Denis
Black French sportspeople